The County Line School and Lodge is a historic multifunction community building in rural western Fulton County, Arkansas.  It stands at the junction of County Roads 115 and 236, just east of the county line with Baxter County, west of the small community of Gepp.  It is a vernacular two story wood-frame structure with a gable roof and a cast stone foundation.  The ground floor houses a school room, and the upper floor was used for meetings of the County Line Masonic Lodge.  It was built c. 1879, and was one of the first community buildings to be built in the area.  Intended to actually stand astride the county line (since it served communities in both counties), a later survey determined it lies a few feet within Fulton County.  The building was used as a school until 1948, when the local school systems were consolidated.

The building was listed on the National Register of Historic Places in 1975, at which time it was still in use by the Masons.

See also
National Register of Historic Places listings in Fulton County, Arkansas

References

School buildings on the National Register of Historic Places in Arkansas
School buildings completed in 1879
Buildings and structures in Fulton County, Arkansas
Clubhouses in Arkansas
National Register of Historic Places in Fulton County, Arkansas
Masonic buildings in Arkansas